Aaron Findlay is a former member of the Russian national rugby league team who played in the 2000 Rugby League World Cup.

Biography
Findlay was born in Australia and holds Australian citizenship. He played lower grades for the Canterbury-Bankstown Bulldogs. In 2000, he became one of seven Australian citizens who, because of his Russian roots, received the right to play for the Russian team at the 2000 Rugby League World Cup. He played two matches in the tournament for Russia.

References

Living people
Australian rugby league players
Russia national rugby league team players
Year of birth missing (living people)
Place of birth missing (living people)
Australian people of Russian descent
Rugby league second-rows